"Bad Habits" is 1985 crossover dance single by Jenny Burton, former lead singer of the group C-Bank. The single went to number one on the US dance chart and remained on the chart for eleven weeks. It also peaked at number nineteen on the Billboard Hot Soul Singles chart and number 68 on the UK Singles Chart.

Cover versions
The song was covered by ATFC presents OnePhatDeeva titled "Bad Habit" on Defected Records. It reached number 17 on the UK Singles Chart in September 2000.

References

1985 songs
1985 singles
Songs written by Fred McFarlane
Atlantic Records singles